Meridarchis tristriga is a moth in the Carposinidae family. It is found in Burma.

References

Diakonoff, A. 1951, Entomological results from the Swedish Expedition 1934 to Burma and British India. Lepidoptera, Collected by René Malaise, Microlepidoptera I. With 1 map and 35 figures in the text. - Arkiv för Zoologi Band 3 nr. 6, Almqvist & Wiksell Boktryckeri, Uppsala. 59 - 94 pp.
Natural History Museum Lepidoptera generic names catalog

External links
Swedish Museum of Natural History: Image of the type

Carposinidae